The 1979 Lehigh Engineers football team was an American football team that represented Lehigh University as an independent during the 1979 NCAA Division I-AA football season. The Engineers finished the year ranked No. 3 in Division I-AA and qualified for the four-team national playoff. They won their semifinal but lost the 1979 NCAA Division I-AA Football Championship Game.

In their fourth year under head coach John Whitehead, the Engineers compiled a 10–3 record (9–2 in the regular season). Rich Andres, Jim McCormick and Eric Yaszemski were the team captains.

Lehigh returned to the national championship two years after winning the NCAA Division II Football Championship and the Lambert Cup in 1977. Its two regular season losses in 1979 were away games at Colgate, a Division I-A team, and at Delaware, the eventual Division II champion.

Lehigh played its home games at Taylor Stadium on the university's main campus in Bethlehem, Pennsylvania.

Schedule

References

Lehigh
Lehigh Mountain Hawks football seasons
Lehigh Engineers football